The President of the United States can establish a national monument by presidential proclamation, and the United States Congress can by legislation. The Antiquities Act of 1906 authorized the president to proclaim "historic landmarks, historic and prehistoric structures, and other objects of historic or scientific interest" as national monuments.

Interior Department memorandum
In a 2010 "Not for Release" memorandum by the United States Department of the Interior, 14 areas were listed in the "Prospective Conservation Designation" attachment as "good candidates for National Monument designation under the Antiquities Act". Those areas are included in the lists below, shaded bluish-green.

In subsequent attachments in the same draft, "areas worthy of protection that are ineligible for Monument Designation and unlikely to receive legislative protection in the near term" and "cost estimates" of "high priority land-rationalization efforts" were listed.

Proposed national monuments

See also 
America's Most Endangered Places
List of threatened historic sites in the United States
List of national monuments of the United States
List of national parks of the United States
List of national memorials of the United States
List of areas in the United States National Park System
National Conservation Lands

Notes

References

External links
 5 Natural Landscapes on Our National Monument Wish List: Here’s how to make “America’s best idea” even better by the Sierra Club

 
Proposed National Monuments
United States National Monuments
.Proposed
Proposed National Monuments